Municipalities (singular ) are the lowest level of official territorial division in Germany. This can be the second, third, fourth or fifth level of territorial division, depending on the status of the municipality and the Land (federal state) it is part of. The city-states Berlin and Hamburg are second-level divisions. A Gemeinde is one level lower in those states which also include Regierungsbezirke (singular: Regierungsbezirk) as an intermediate territorial division (Baden-Württemberg, Bavaria, Hesse and North Rhine-Westphalia). The Gemeinde is one level higher if it is not part of a Gemeindeverband ("municipal association"). 

The highest degree of autonomy may be found in the Gemeinden which are not part of a Kreis ("district"). These Gemeinden are referred to as Kreisfreie Städte or Stadtkreise, often translated as "urban district".   In some states they retained a higher measure of autonomy than the other municipalities of the Kreis (e.g. Große Kreisstadt). Municipalities titled Stadt (town or city) are urban municipalities while those titled Gemeinde are classified as rural municipalities.

With more than 3,600,000 inhabitants, the most populous municipality of Germany is the city of Berlin; and the least populous is Gröde in Schleswig-Holstein.

Municipalities per federal state
Status as of December 2018.

Municipal reforms

The number of municipalities of Germany has decreased strongly over the years: in 1968 there were 24,282 municipalities in West Germany, and in 1980 there were 8,409. The same trend occurred in the New states of Germany after the German reunification: from 7,612 municipalities in 1990 to 2,627 at the end of 2018. While in some cases growing cities absorbed neighbouring municipalities, most of these mergers were driven by a need to increase the efficiency and reduce costs of administration. At the same time, many districts and also urban districts were merged into larger districts.

Types of municipalities

There are several types of municipalities in Germany, with different levels of autonomy. Each federal state has its own administrative laws, and its own local government structure. The main types of municipalities are:
city state: Berlin and Hamburg are both municipalities and federal states
urban district: a municipality that is not part of a district, and hence fulfills the responsibilities of both a municipality and a district. As of 2018, there are 107 urban districts (including Berlin and Hamburg)
town: a municipality with the right to call itself "Stadt". The title "Stadt" does not imply any duties or rights anymore. Many towns received town privileges in the Middle Ages, others were elevated to town status more recently because they reached a certain size, e.g. more than 10,000 inhabitants
Administrative duties are performed by the Gemeindeverband ("municipal association") 

Local elections

In all municipalities, the mayor and the members of the municipal council are appointed by local elections that take place on a regular basis. Elections for the municipal councils take place every 4 years in Bremen, every 6 years in Bavaria and every 5 years in all other states. 

The office of mayor is full-time in larger municipalities, and voluntary in smaller municipalities, for instance those that are part of a municipal association. Mayors are elected for a specific term, which is different in every state. Since mayoral elections also have to be held when a mayor resigns from office, these do not take place at the same time for all municipalities in a state. The terms for mayors are:
Baden-Württemberg: 8 years
Bavaria, Hesse, Thuringia: 6 years
Berlin, Hamburg: 5 years, indirect elections
Brandenburg, Rhineland-Palatinate: 8 years for full-time mayors, 5 years for voluntary mayors
Bremen: 4-6 years, indirect elections
Lower Saxony, North Rhine-Westphalia: 5 years
Mecklenburg-Vorpommern: 7-9 years for full-time mayors, 5 years for voluntary mayors
Saarland: 10 years
Saxony, Saxony-Anhalt: 7 years
Schleswig-Holstein: 6-8 years for full-time mayors, 5 years for voluntary mayors

See also
List of municipalities in Germany

References

 
Germany 4
Germany
Germany
Germany
Germany